Elections to Birmingham City Council in England were held on 1 May 2008. One third of the council was up for election and the council stayed under no overall control as it had been since 2003.

230 candidates stood in the election for the 40 seats that were contested. Five parties contested every ward in Birmingham, the Conservatives, Labour, Liberal Democrats, British National Party and the Greens. Overall turnout across the city was 31.2%

The results saw the Conservative party gain significantly, winning 6 seats from the Labour party and Respect gain an independent seat. The Liberal Democrats were pleased to hold all their seats. As a result, the Conservative and Liberal Democrat ruling coalition increased their majority to hold 75% of the seats on the council. Both Conservatives and Liberal Democrats attributed their success to below inflation council tax rises and the national unpopularity of the Labour government.

Election result

Ward results

References

Birmingham City Council election service (with links to results)
2008 Birmingham Council election (BBC)
Row over Tory candidate leaflet
Birmingham local election results

2008
2008 English local elections
2000s in Birmingham, West Midlands